These are the official results of the men's 50 km walk at the 1996 Summer Olympics in Atlanta, Georgia.

Medalists

Abbreviations
All times shown are in hours:minutes:seconds

Records

Results

See also
1996 Race Walking Year Ranking

References

External links
 Official Report
 Results

W
Racewalking at the Olympics
Men's events at the 1996 Summer Olympics